Here Before is the fifth studio album by the American rock band the Feelies. It was released on April 12, 2011, on Bar/None.

Reception

This album received positive reviews from Michael Hann, Stuart Berman, and Mark Deming also earning a score of 73 out of a possible 100 based on 17 critical reviews by Metacritic, indicating generally positive feedback.

Track listing

Personnel 

 Glenn Mercer – guitar, vocals
 Bill Million – guitar, vocals
 Dave Weckerman – percussion
 Brenda Sauter – bass, vocals
 Stan Demeski – drums

References

2011 albums
The Feelies albums
Bar/None Records albums